DJ Screw and the Screwed Up Click Presents Under H.A.W.K.'s Wings is the debut studio album by American rapper Big Hawk from Houston, Texas. It was released on January 4, 2000 via Dead End. The album peaked at #68 on the US Billboard Top R&B/Hip-Hop Albums chart.

Track listing

Chart positions

References

External links

2000 debut albums
Big Hawk albums